Egg Rock Light is a lighthouse on Frenchman Bay, Maine.  Built in 1875, it is one of coastal Maine's architecturally unique lighthouses, with a square tower projecting through the square keeper's house. Located on Egg Rock, midway between Mount Desert Island and the Schoodic Peninsula, it is an active aid to navigation, flashing red every 40 seconds. The light was listed on the National Register of Historic Places as Egg Rock Light Station in 1988.

Description and history
The Egg Rock Light Station consists of two buildings, a combination light tower and keeper's house, and a fog station building. The keeper's house is a roughly square -story wood-frame building, with a hip roof pierced by dormers on all four sides. The light is a VRB-25 aerobeacon, mounted in a 1986 replacement lantern house. It is configured to flash red every 40 seconds. The fog station is a brick structure southwest of the main building, with a gable-on-hip roof.

The Egg Rock light originally was fitted with a fifth-order Fresnel lens.  The fog station (originally steam-powered) was added in 1904.  The station was automated by the United States Coast Guard in 1976, at which time its ancillary structures except the fog station were torn down.  The lantern house was removed and the light was replaced by the present aerobeacon.  After public protest, a replacement lantern house was installed in 1986.  The light continues to be managed by the Coast Guard, and is not open to the public; the island and buildings are owned by the United States Fish and Wildlife Service.

See also

National Register of Historic Places listings in Hancock County, Maine

References

External links

Lighthouses completed in 1875
Lighthouses on the National Register of Historic Places in Maine
Lighthouses in Hancock County, Maine
Historic districts on the National Register of Historic Places in Maine
National Register of Historic Places in Hancock County, Maine